Produce X 101 is a South Korean reality television show.

Contestants
The spelling of names in English is according to the official website. The Korean contestants are presented in Eastern order (family name, given name). The age listed is according to the Korean age system at the start of the competition. The new X rank means the contestants are the least prepared, and are the most vulnerable to be eliminated.

Color key

Group X Battle Performances (Episodes 3-4)

Bold denotes the person who picked the team members. Son Dong-pyo, who was center position for the "X1-MA" theme song performance, chose his team first, and the other 7 captains selected by lottery to choose their members afterwards. The songs' artist was chosen by a race. After picking an artist, the captains then chose a song and half of their team to create their final group, with the other half receiving the other song and becoming their opposing group.

(*) denotes the team with the highest score that can perform on M Countdown. All contestants of each winning team received a bonus of 3,000 votes, with the top contestants receiving ten times their votes.

Color key

Position Evaluation Performances (Episodes 6-7)

Each contestant performs in either the Vocal, Rap, Dance, or "X" position on a particular song. "X" is a new position that requires contestants to perform two of the three aforementioned positions. For Vocal, Rap, and Dance positions, the top contestant for each song receives 100 times their votes, while the top contestant among all songs of each position receives a 100,000 vote bonus. For the "X" position, both bonuses are doubled. For "Me After You" and "Attention" teams, the number of votes received by some members was not posted.

Color key

Concept Evaluation Performances (Episode 10)
The contestants were assigned into different concept songs through a voting system which took place between the first and second elimination rounds. When the second elimination round concluded, some contestants were reshuffled into different concept songs if their teams had more than six contestants. The contestant with the most votes in each team receives 500 times their votes. The winning team also receives an additional 200,000 vote bonus that is split based on each contestant's ranking: the contestant with the most votes receives 100,000 votes, while the remaining contestants receive 20,000 votes.

Color key

Debut Evaluation Performances (Episode 12)
Color key

Notes

References

 
Produce X 101 contestants
Produce X101 contestants
Produce X101 contestants
Produce X101 contestants
Produce X101 contestants